The Eagles Temple or Eagles' Temple in Canton, Ohio is a Spanish Colonial Revival building designed during 1927–28.  It was listed on the National Register of Historic Places in 1982.

It is a five-story building designed by architect Albert Thayer.  It is the only building built for the Canton Aerie 141, which was founded in 1901, and was the oldest chapter of the Fraternal Order of Eagles in Ohio.

References

Clubhouses on the National Register of Historic Places in Ohio
Fraternal Order of Eagles buildings
Buildings and structures in Canton, Ohio
National Register of Historic Places in Stark County, Ohio